Abdurrahman Yavuz Kalkan (born 19 August 1973) is a Turkish former professional footballer who played as a striker. He is most well known for playing for Malatyaspor.

References

1973 births
People from Mardin
Turkish footballers
Association football forwards
Malatyaspor footballers
Living people